Francisco Ismael Segundo Parraguez Cabezas, or simply Ismael Parraguez (1883—8 May 1917) was a Chilean musician, Normal teacher, poet, and novelist. He was known for being the creator of the Orfeón Chileno in 1914, during the centennial of the Battle of Rancagua and the children's poem Los pollitos dicen, which he published on his 1907 book Poesías Infantiles. Parraguez was also known by the pseudonym of Misael Guerra.

Biography
Francisco Ismael Segundo was born on 26 August 1883, at Fundo Las Pataguas in Pichidegua, Colchagua province, in central Chile. Parraguez studied at the Escuela Normal José Abelardo Núñez in Santiago. He graduated there in 1899 as a normal teacher. According to Héctor González, a Chilean writer and journalist for the El Rancagüino newspaper, Parraguez was known for "his great way to teach how to sing to his students, for the songs he wrote, spread all over the country." He published his first book, Un idilio menos, in 1903, which soon went out of stock. It was followed by Poesías infantiles some years later, in 1907. Esperanza, his last novel, was published in 1916.

Other works by Parraguez, according to historian Antonio Saldías, include the Hymn of the Liceo de Aplicación of Santiago, and the music of the Hymn of the Instituto Nacional General José Miguel Carrera; Parraguez worked at both schools as a teacher.

Parraguez married Ester Ortiz, with whom he had five children: Hernán, Flora, Julio, Waldo, and Gonzalo. Ismael Parraguez died unexpectedly aged 33 on 8 May 1917 in Santiago.

Works
 Un idilio menos (1903)
 Poesías infantiles (1907)
 Orfeón Chileno (1914)
 Urbe; poema en dos cantos i un paréntesis, así: I. La ciudad viva (1915)
 Esperanza (1916)

 Appeared in
 Selva lírica (anthology, 1917)

References

1883 births
1917 deaths
People from Cachapoal Province
Chilean musicians
Chilean educators
Chilean male novelists
Chilean male poets
20th-century Chilean poets
20th-century Chilean novelists
20th-century Chilean male writers